"Do It for Your Lover" is a song performed by Spanish singer Manel Navarro and written by himself together with Antonio Rayo "Rayito". The song was released as a digital download on 13 January 2017 through Sony Music Spain. It represented Spain in the Eurovision Song Contest 2017. The song finished last overall in the final of the contest.

Eurovision Song Contest

On 12 January 2017, Navarro was confirmed to be one of the six finalists competing in Objetivo Eurovisión 2017, Spain's national final for the Eurovision Song Contest 2017. On 11 February 2017, the night of the final, Navarro finished first with the juries and third with the Spanish public, tying him with Mirela and her song "Contigo". The jury then broke the tie in Navarro's favour, and he was declared the winner. As Spain is a member of the "Big Five", he automatically advanced to the final, held on 13 May 2017 in Kyiv, Ukraine.

Live performances
Manel Navarro performed the song live for the first time on Objetivo Eurovisión on 11 February 2017, where he won the competition amid much controversy. On 18 February, Manel Navarro performed the song at the Ukrainian national final for the Eurovision Song Contest 2017 as a special guest during the third semi-final. On 25 February, he performed the song on talk show ¡Qué tiempo tan feliz!, aired on Telecinco.<ref>{{cite web|title=Manel Navarro interpreta en '¡Qué tiempo tan feliz!' su eurovisiva canción|trans-title=Manel Navarro performs his Eurovision song on ¡Qué tiempo tan feliz!'|url=http://www.telecinco.es/quetiempotanfeliz/actuaciones/Manel-Navarro-interpreta-eurovisiva-cancion_2_2329980096.html|website=telecinco.es|publisher=Telecinco|access-date=26 February 2017|date=25 February 2017|language=es}}</ref> On 5 March, he also performed as a guest performer during the Romanian Eurovision national final. On 2 April, Manel Navarro performed the song during the London Eurovision Party, which was held at the Café de Paris venue in London, United Kingdom. On 5 April, he performed at the Israel Calling event in Tel Aviv, Israel. Navarro also performed the song during the 2017 Eurovision in Concert, the largest gathering of Eurovision artists outside of Eurovision itself, held in the Melkweg, a popular music venue in Amsterdam, the Netherlands on 8 April. On 15 April, he performed during the Eurovision-Spain Pre-Party'' event which was held at the Sala La Riviera venue in Madrid.

Manel Navarro performed the song live during the final of the Eurovision Song Contest 2017 in Kyiv, Ukraine on 13 May 2017. Hans Pannecoucke was the staging director for this performance. In the climax of the song, Navarro went notoriously off-key, and his bad result was partly attributed to it. He obtained no points from the professional juries and only five from the public televote (all from Portugal), finishing in twenty-sixth (last) place in the final.

Music video
The official video of the song, directed by Mauri D. Galiano, was filmed in February 2017 on the north coast of Tenerife, Canary Islands. The video premiered on Manel Navarro's YouTube Vevo channel on 9 March 2017.

Track listing

Charts

Release history

References

Eurovision songs of Spain
Eurovision songs of 2017
2016 songs
2017 singles
Sony Music singles
Songs written by Rayito